Matthew Otten (born December 8, 1981) is an American retired basketball player and current coach. He last held the position of head coach of Donar. Otten holds a Dutch passport as well and played the shooting guard position during his career.

Professional career
Otten was part of the GasTerra Flames in 2010 and 2011, the years in which the club won a Dutch cup and national championship. In the 2011–12 season, Otten played for Mersey Tigers in the United Kingdom. In 2012 Otten returned to the Netherlands in 2012, when he signed with Rotterdam Basketbal College. After one year with the club, his contract was renewed. His numbers rose in his second season in Rotterdam, as Otten averaged 13.4 points per game compared to 9.0 the previous season. In June 2014, Otten re-signed again with Challenge Sports Rotterdam.

After the 2014–15 season, Otten retired.

Coaching career
In 2015, Otten started his coaching career as assistant with Den Bosch.

Since June 2019, Otten is assistant coach of  under Maurizio Buscaglia. He joined the team for EuroBasket 2022 in Prague.

On 9 August 2020, Otten signed as head coach for newly established club Basketball Community Gelderland, marking his debut as head coach in the Dutch Basketball League. Later, the club was named Yoast United. With Yoast, he managed to qualify for the final of the 2021 DBL Cup where the team lost to BAL Weert.

On May 25, 2021, Otten signed a two-year contract as the head coach of Donar, with the option for a third season. On March 20, 2022, he won the Dutch Cup with Donar, guiding the team to its first trophy since 2018. In the national playoffs, Donar was swept by rival Heroes Den Bosch in the semifinals; however, the team reached the BNXT playoff finals, where they lost to ZZ Leiden.

On October 13, shortly after the start of the 2022–23 season, Otten was fired by Donar after losing all pre-season games as well as the first two official games of the season.

Awards and accomplishments

As coach
Donar
 Dutch Cup: (2022)

As player
Donar
 Dutch Basketball League: (2010)
Dutch Cup: (2011)

References

1981 births
Living people
American expatriate basketball people in Cyprus
American expatriate basketball people in the Netherlands
American expatriate basketball people in Switzerland
American expatriate basketball people in the United Kingdom
American men's basketball players
Apollon Limassol BC players
Cheshire Phoenix players
Donar (basketball club) players
Donar (basketball club) coaches
Dutch Basketball League players
Dutch men's basketball players
Dutch basketball coaches
Junior college men's basketball players in the United States
Lugano Tigers players
Mersey Tigers players
Feyenoord Basketball players
San Francisco State Gators men's basketball players
Shooting guards
Sportspeople from Las Vegas
Yoast United coaches